Yi Yung-jun (22 November 1858 – 25 May 1859) was an heir presumptive of Joseon (wonja, 원자, 元子) as the only son of Yi Byeon, King Cheoljong and Queen Cheorin. From birth he became a Wonja and unlike his half-brothers, he seemed to have grown well without any illnesses, but died suddenly due to a fever on 25 May, 1859, at six months of age. The next day, the King announced his young son's death and ordered his soldiers to accompany him when holding the young prince's funeral.

References

강화도령 철종의 예릉 (in Korean). Retrieved April 15, 2021.
숙의범씨묘 in Naver (in Korean). Retrieved April 15, 2021.

1858 births
1859 deaths
Korean princes
19th-century Korean people
Royalty and nobility who died as children